The Hanna–Honeycomb House, also known as simply the Hanna House, located on the Stanford University campus in Stanford, California, United States, was Frank Lloyd Wright's first work in the Bay Area and his first work with non-rectangular structures. The house was chosen by the American Institute of Architects as one of seventeen buildings by the architect to be retained as an example of his contribution to American culture. It was recognized as a National Historic Landmark on June 29, 1989.

Name
The Hanna house, maintained by Stanford University, is called Honeycomb House because the Usonian structure's plan is fashioned on a hexagonal unit system, a module that replaced the octagon as Wright's favorite from this time on. — William Allin Storrer

Design
Begun in 1937 and expanded over 25 years, this is the first and best example of Wright's innovative hexagonal design. A Usonian home patterned after the honeycomb of a bee, the 3,570 square foot house incorporates six-sided figures with 120-degree angles in its plan, in its numerous tiled terraces, and even in built-in furnishings. In American National Bibliography Frederick Ivor-Campbell wrote "(the) Honeycomb House showed how Wright's system of Polygonal modules could provide the openness that he associated with freedom of movement while gracefully integrating the house with its sloping topography. The hexagonal modules of the floor plan gave the appearance of a honeycomb; hence the name of the house." There are no right angles on the floor plan.

The Hanna-Honeycomb house was designed for Professor Paul Robert Hanna (1902-1988), and his wife, Jean Shuman Hanna (1902-1987), both well-known educators and for many years associated with Stanford University. The project was begun while they were a young married couple with three children. The home thus had four bedrooms and three bathrooms. In the years following the departure of the children, the house was expanded and modified (with Wright's assistance) as the professional and personal needs of the Hannas changed.

Construction and restoration
The construction process was not without difficulty. Wright's initial plans called for flat terrain, but the lot the Hannas purchased was hilly. Cost overruns meant that the original $15,000 price tag ballooned to over $37,000 ($ adjusted for inflation). Additionally, the Hannas discovered that their lot encompassed a portion of the San Andreas Fault. Wright, whose Imperial Hotel had survived the 1923 Great Kantō earthquake, was undaunted. Unfortunately, the home was severely damaged by the 1989 Loma Prieta earthquake. Although that branch of the fault was inactive during the quake, the foundation and chimney were essentially unreinforced and likely would have collapsed if the earthquake had lasted longer. A major 10-year restoration was completed in April 1999, this time with seismic reinforcement.

Features
The house is one-story high with a central clerestory (an outside wall of a room or building that rises above an adjoining roof and contains windows) and is constructed of native redwood board and batten, common wire-cut San Jose brick, concrete and plate glass. The house clings to, and completes the hillside on which it was built as the floor and courtyard levels conform to the slope of this one and one-half acre site. The entire site includes the main house, a guesthouse, hobby shop, storage building, double carport, breezeway, and garden house with pools and water cascade.

Current use
After living in the house for 38 years, the Hannas gave the property to Stanford University in 1974, to house scholars in international education, instead, it housed four university provosts.

It is open for tours by reservation only. It is occasionally used for university functions such as seminars and receptions.

Exterior Picture Gallery

Further reading 
 "Hanna, Paul R. Residence, Palo Alto", Architect and Engineer, 3, 08/1937.
 Joncas, Richard, Turner, Paul V., "Paul and Jean Hanna House, 737 Frenchman's Road", Campus Guide Stanford University, Second Edition, 76-77, 2006.
Moore, Charles W., Allen, Gerald, Dimensions Space Shape and Scale in Architecture, 55, 1976.
Maddex, Diane, "Hanna House", Frank Lloyd Wright Inside and Out, 130-131, 2001.
Hanna, Paul R., Hanna, Jean S., Frank Lloyd Wright's Hanna House; The Clients' Report, 1981.

References

Sources
Storrer, William Allin. The Frank Lloyd Wright Companion. University Of Chicago Press, 2006,  (S.235)

External links

Hanna House web site
Hanna House Collection (Stanford University Archives)

Frank Lloyd Wright buildings
Houses completed in 1937
Stanford University buildings and structures
Houses on the National Register of Historic Places in California
National Historic Landmarks in the San Francisco Bay Area
1937 establishments in California
Houses in Santa Clara County, California
National Register of Historic Places in Santa Clara County, California